Fabio Garbari (born 1937) is an Italian botanist who has a degree in Biological Science from the University of Pisa awarded in 1958. In 2000–2002 he was a professor in the Department of Botanical Science of the University of Pisa. In 2019 he was awarded the Veitch Memorial Medal by the Royal Horticultural Society.

Publications

References

1937 births
20th-century Italian botanists
Living people
Veitch Memorial Medal recipients
21st-century Italian botanists